Year of the Rabbit is a year in the Chinese zodiac.

Year of the Rabbit may also refer to:
 Year of the Rabbit (album)
 Year of the Rabbit (ballet)
 Year of the Rabbit (band)
 Year of the Rabbit (TV series)